Anna-Karin Persson (born 14 April 1973) is a former Swedish Olympic swimmer. She competed in the 1988 Summer Olympics, where she swam the 4×100 meter medley relay.

Clubs
Kungälvs SS

References

1973 births
Swedish female swimmers
Living people
Swimmers at the 1988 Summer Olympics
Olympic swimmers of Sweden
Kungälvs SS swimmers
Place of birth missing (living people)